Saeed Azarbayjani (born January 17, 1975, in Iran) is an Iranian-Canadian male freestyle wrestler representing Canada. He participated in Men's freestyle 60 kg at 2008 Summer Olympics. In the 1/8 of final he beat Armenian Martin Berberyan, but lost in the quarterfinal to Morad Mohammadi from Iran.

External links
 
 beijing2008.com

1975 births
Brock Badgers wrestlers
Iranian emigrants to Canada
Canadian male sport wrestlers
Living people
Olympic competitors from Iran who represented other countries
Olympic wrestlers of Canada
Wrestlers at the 2008 Summer Olympics